Abigail Paduch (born 16 January 2000) is an Australian judoka.

Paduch was born in Figtree, New South Wales on 16 January 2000. She first tried judo during her first year attending St Andrew's Cathedral School. She joined the New South Wales junior squad within a month and won her first national title within three months. She returned to judo in 2018 after taking a break due to a spinal injury. She received a tier 3 scholarship with 2021 Sport Australia Hall of Fame Scholarship and Mentoring Program.

She won a bronze medal at the 2022 Commonwealth Games in the Women's +78 kg event.

References

2000 births
Living people
Australian female judoka
Judoka at the 2022 Commonwealth Games
Commonwealth Games medallists in judo
Commonwealth Games bronze medallists for Australia
Sportswomen from New South Wales
Sportspeople from Wollongong
Medallists at the 2022 Commonwealth Games